The following is a list of notable deaths in December 2021.

Entries for each day are listed alphabetically by surname. A typical entry lists information in the following sequence:
 Name, age, country of citizenship at birth, subsequent country of citizenship (if applicable), reason for notability, cause of death (if known), and reference.

December 2021

1
Rudolf Bernhardt, 96, German jurist, president of the European Court of Human Rights (1998).
Ben Boo, 96, American politician, mayor of Duluth (1967–1975), member of the Minnesota House of Representatives (1984–1993).
Bertram Bowyer, 2nd Baron Denham, 94, British politician, member of the House of Lords (1949–2021) and captain of the Honourable Corps of Gentlemen-at-Arms (1979–1991).
Sherwin Carlquist, 91, American botanist and photographer.
John Cunningham, 83, Scottish Roman Catholic prelate, bishop of Galloway (2004–2014).
Jean Demannez, 72, Belgian politician, mayor of Saint-Josse-ten-Noode (1999–2012).
Abla Farhoud, 76, Canadian writer.
Grand Jojo, 85, Belgian singer.
John Hepworth, 77, Australian bishop, complications from amyotrophic lateral sclerosis.
Anna-Liisa Hyvönen, 95, Finnish politician, MP (1972–1980).
Enrique Jackson, 75, Mexican politician, deputy (2015–2018), member (1997–2006) and three-time president of the senate, heart attack.
Christian Kerr, 56, Australian political commentator and journalist (The Australian), co-founder of Crikey.
Alvin Lucier, 90, American composer (I Am Sitting in a Room, Music on a Long Thin Wire).
Almerindo Marques, 81, Portuguese businessman, banker and politician, deputy (1983–1985) and president of Rádio e Televisão de Portugal (2002–2008).
Jas Murphy, 98, Irish Gaelic footballer (Cork, Kerry).
Keiko Nobumoto, 57, Japanese screenwriter (Cowboy Bebop, Wolf's Rain, Tokyo Godfathers), esophageal cancer.
Seánie O'Leary, 69, Irish hurler (Cork, Youghal).
Orm Øverland, 86, Norwegian literary historian.
Nikolai Paltsev, 72, Russian politician, mayor of Stavropol (2008–2011).
Rudolf Pohl, 97, German Roman Catholic prelate.
Konrad Porzner, 86, German politician, MP (1962–1981, 1983–1990).
Raimundo Revoredo Ruiz, 93, Peruvian Roman Catholic prelate, bishop-prelate of Juli (1988–1999).
Alan Clive Roberts, 87, British materials scientist and engineer.
Sir John Roch, 87, British judge, Lord Justice of Appeal (1993–2000).
Razi Shirazi, 94, Iranian jurist and philosopher.
Petr Uhl, 80, Czech journalist, activist and politician, member of the Federal Assembly (1990–1992).
Rainbow George Weiss, 81, British serial political candidate.
Suzette Winter, 90, American filmmaker.
Miroslav Zikmund, 102, Czech writer and explorer.

2
János Avar, 83, Hungarian journalist (Magyar Nemzet).
Samuel Bhend, 78, Swiss politician, member of the Executive Council of Bern (1997–2006).
Giuseppe Chiaretti, 88, Italian Roman Catholic prelate, archbishop of Perugia–Città della Pieve (1995–2009).
Richard Cole, 75, English music manager (Led Zeppelin), cancer.
Richard Costello, 70, American police officer, heart failure.
Jos Dupré, 93, Belgian politician, mayor of Westerlo (1977–1982, 1989–1996).
Diana G. Gallagher, 75, American author (Obsidian Fate, Bad Bargain, Doomsday Deck), chronic obstructive pulmonary disease.
Aldo Giordano, 67, Italian Roman Catholic prelate, apostolic nuncio to Venezuela (2013–2021) and the European Union (since 2021), COVID-19.
Gérard Grandval, 91, French architect.
Darlene Hard, 85, American Hall of Fame tennis player.
Phil Harvey, 83, American entrepreneur and philanthropist, founder of DKT International.
Hong Sung-woo, 81, South Korean politician, MP (1979–1988).
Ian Hore-Lacy, 81, Australian nuclear industry communicator.
Joaquín Jiménez Hidalgo, 85, Spanish politician, senator (1982–1986).
Abdel Karim al Kabli, 89, Sudanese singer and poet.
Michael Laucke, 74, Canadian classical and flamenco guitarist and composer.
Lyndsey Leask, 86, New Zealand softball administrator.
Richard Lerner, 83, American chemist.
Tom McGarry, 84, Irish hurler, footballer and rugby union player.
Bill McKenzie, Baron McKenzie of Luton, 75, British politician and life peer, member of the House of Lords (since 2004).
Alex Orban, 82, Hungarian-American Olympic sabre fencer (1968, 1972, 1976).
Poedjono Pranyoto, 85, Indonesian military officer and politician, regent of Cilacap (1979–1987), governor of Lampung (1988–1997) and deputy speaker of the MPR-R (1997–1999).
Felice Salis, 83, Italian Olympic field hockey player (1960).
Sir Antony Sher, 72, South African-born British actor (Stanley, Shakespeare in Love, The Wolfman), cancer.
Lovro Šturm, 83, Slovenian jurist and politician, minister of justice (2004–2008) and president of the Constitutional Court (1997–1998).
Lawrence Weiner, 79, American conceptual artist.

3
Güldal Akşit, 61, Turkish politician, minister of culture and tourism (2002–2003), COVID-19.
Man Arai, 75, Japanese writer and singer.
Eileen Ash, 110, English cricketer (Middlesex, national team).
Vesma Baltgailis, 71, Latvian-born Canadian chess player.
Jean Briane, 91, French politician, deputy (1971–2002).
Françoise Delord, 81, French zookeeper, founder of the ZooParc de Beauval.
Lamine Diack, 88, Senegalese businessman, sports administrator, and athlete, president of the IAAF (1999–2015).
Horst Eckel, 89, German footballer (1. FC Kaiserslautern, SV Röchling Völklingen, West Germany national team), world champion (1954).
Nathaniel Exum, 81, American politician, member of the Maryland House of Delegates (1975–1999) and Senate (1999–2011).
Fortune FitzRoy, Duchess of Grafton, 101, British courtier, mistress of the Robes (since 1967).
Marian Hadenko, 66, Ukrainian composer, singer, and television presenter.
Peter Hayek, 64, American ice hockey player (Minnesota North Stars).
Robert Holman, 69, British dramatist (Rafts and Dreams, A Thousand Stars Explode in the Sky).
Wout Holverda, 63, Dutch footballer (Sparta, Fortuna Sittard), COVID-19.
Claude Humphrey, 77, American Hall of Fame football player (Atlanta Falcons, Philadelphia Eagles).
Lee Tae-bok, 70, South Korean politician, minister of health and welfare (2002).
Claudia Levy, 77, American journalist and union activist.
Peter Nagy, 56, Slovakian Olympic slalom canoeist (1996, 2000).
Mirco Nontschew, 52, German comedian (RTL Samstag Nacht). (body discovered on this date)
Denis O'Brien, 80, American talent manager (George Harrison) and film producer (Monty Python's Life of Brian, Time Bandits).
Melvin Parker, 77, American drummer (James Brown).
Saul Raiz, 91, Brazilian politician, mayor of Curitiba (1975–1979).
Jean Rosset, 84, French sculptor.
Edward Shames, 99, American Army colonel, last surviving officer of Easy Company.
Charlotte Mailliard Shultz, 88, American socialite, cancer.
Sampath Tennakoon, 62, Sri Lankan actor (Saroja, Gini Avi Saha Gini Keli, Siri Raja Siri), lung cancer.
Jim Troumbly, 93, American ice hockey player.
Nina Urgant, 92, Russian actress (Tamer of Tigers, Belorussian Station, Bonus).
Alfonso Vallejo, 78, Spanish playwright and poet.
Momčilo Vukotić, 71, Serbian footballer (FK Partizan, FC Girondins de Bordeaux, Yugoslavia national team).
Ronald S. Weinstein, 83, American pathologist.
Jōji Yanami, 90, Japanese voice actor (Dragon Ball, Time Bokan, One Piece).

4
Thoppil Anto, 81, Indian playback singer.
John Barton, 77, British businessman, chairman of Next plc and EasyJet.
Ron Blazier, 50, American baseball player (Philadelphia Phillies).
Hans Blohm, 94, German-Canadian photographer and author.
Sarath Chandrasiri, 57, Sri Lankan actor (Dr. Nawariyan, Mago Digo Dai, Ran Kevita), brain hemorrhage.
Sabbaruddin Chik, 79, Malaysian politician, minister of tourism, arts and culture (1987–1996), MP (1982–1999), COVID-19.
Carl Clowes, 77, Welsh medical practitioner.
Martha De Laurentiis, 67, American film producer (Breakdown, Hannibal, U-571), cancer.
Vinod Dua, 67, Indian journalist (Doordarshan, NDTV India), complications from COVID-19.
John Flynn, 67, Canadian politician, New Brunswick MLA (1995–1999), cancer.
Mahmoud Hammoud, 57, Lebanese football player (Nejmeh, national team) and manager (Shabab Sahel), COVID-19.
Golam Hasnayen, 91, Bangladeshi lawyer.
Stonewall Jackson, 89, American country singer ("Waterloo", "B.J. the D.J.", "I Washed My Hands in Muddy Water"), vascular dementia.
Percy Johnson, 88, Australian football player (East Fremantle, Claremont) and coach (Swan Districts), cancer.
Navid Khosh Hava, 30, Iranian footballer (Rah Ahan, Paykan, PAS Hamedan), cardiac arrest.
Alois Kottmann, 92, German violinist and music pedagogue.
Paul Lannoye, 82, Belgian politician, MEP (1989–2004).
Andy McCabe, 76, Irish Gaelic footballer.
Leonardo McNish, 75, Guatemalan footballer (Deportivo Malacateco, Cobán Imperial, national team).
Boris Misnik, 83, Russian politician, deputy (1995–2000).
Nirmal Nanan, 70, Trinidadian cricketer (Nottinghamshire).
Mike Page, 81, American baseball player (Atlanta Braves).
Trilochan Pradhan, 92, Indian physicist and academic administrator, vice-chancellor of Utkal University (1989–1991).
Pierre Rabhi, 83, Algerian-born French environmentalist.
Konijeti Rosaiah, 88, Indian politician, governor of Tamil Nadu (2011–2016) and Karnataka (2014), chief minister of Andhra Pradesh (2009–2010).
Shivaram, 83, Indian actor (Bhajarangi, Mukunda Murari, Bangara s/o Bangarada Manushya), film producer and director, brain hemorrhage.
Wu Xinzhi, 93, Chinese paleoanthropologist, member of the Chinese Academy of Sciences.
Mohammed Inuwa Wushishi, 81, Nigerian general, chief of Army staff (1981–1983).
Xavier Ziani, 49, French volleyball player (Tourcoing Lille Métropole Volley-Ball, Paris Volley, national team), cardiac arrest.
Shirley Zussman, 107, American sex therapist.

5
Aad Andriessen, 60, Dutch footballer (Sparta Rotterdam).
Osman Arpacıoğlu, 74, Turkish footballer (Mersin İdman Yurdu, Fenerbahçe, national team).
Lisle Austin, 85, Barbadian football administrator (Barbados Football Association).
Gary Callander, 62, Scottish rugby union player (Kelso, national team) and coach (Watsonian), pancreatic cancer.
Júlio Eduardo Zamith Carrilho, 74–75, Mozambican politician, minister of public works and housing (1975–1979), industry (1979–1980), and construction and water (1980–1986).
Peter Cundall, 94, English-born Australian horticulturalist and television host (Gardening Australia).
Jean-Paul Didierlaurent, 59, French writer, cancer.
Bob Dole, 98, American politician, member of the U.S. House of Representatives (1961–1969) and Senate (1969–1996), lung cancer.
Oleg Emirov, 51, Russian composer, arranger and keyboardist (Kolibri, Tequilajazzz).
Aurelio Galfetti, 85, Swiss architect.
Harry Giles, 91, Canadian educator.
Prithipal Singh Gill, 100, Indian military officer.
Bill Glass, 86, American Hall of Fame football player (Baylor Bears, Cleveland Browns, Detroit Lions).
Christine Haidegger, 79, Austrian writer.
Stevan Jelovac, 32, Serbian basketball player (JuveCaserta, Brose Bamberg, CAI Zaragoza), complications from brain hemorrhage.
Manolo Jiménez, 79, Spanish footballer (FC Barcelona, RC Celta de Vigo).
Herbert Knoblich, 82, German politician, president of the Landtag of Brandenburg (1990–2004).
Sławomir Majusiak, 57, Polish long-distance runner.
M. Sarada Menon, 98, Indian psychiatrist.
Buddy Merrill, 85, American steel guitarist (The Lawrence Welk Show).
Melinda Micco, 73, American filmmaker and scholar.
John Miles, 72, British singer-songwriter and musician ("Music").
Bunu Sheriff Musa, 74, Nigerian administrator and engineer.
Scott Page-Pagter, 64, American voice actor and television producer (Power Rangers), cancer.
Enzo Restuccia, 80, Italian drummer.
Michel Rouche, 87, French historian and academic.
Mark Rudinstein, 75, Russian film producer, actor and television presenter, founder of Kinotavr.
Toni Santagata, 85, Italian folk singer.
Song Gisuk, 86, South Korean novelist.
Bill Staines, 74, American folk musician, prostate cancer.
Jacques Tits, 91, Belgian-born French mathematician (Tits alternative, Tits group, Tits metric).
Renato Turano, 79, Italian politician, senator (2006–2008, 2013–2018).
Mario Turchetti, 77, Italian academic and historian, COVID-19.
Demetrio Volcic, 90, Italian journalist (La Repubblica, TG1) and politician, MEP (1999–2004).
Osamu Yatabe, 89, Japanese lawyer and politician, councillor (1974–1998).

6
Hussein Suleiman Abu Saleh, 91, Sudanese politician, minister of foreign affairs (1988–1989, 1993–1995).
André Aschieri, 84, French politician, deputy (1997–2002).
Jørgen Barth-Jørgensen, 89, Norwegian Olympic weightlifter (1952).
Klaus von Beyme, 87, German political scientist.
Teoman Duralı, 74, Turkish philosopher, cancer.
Ebrahim Ismail Ebrahim, 84, South African politician.
Richard Despard Estes, 93, American zoologist.
George Fleming, 83, American football player (Winnipeg Blue Bombers) and politician, member of the Washington House of Representatives (1969–1971) and Senate (1971–1991).
Glenn Foster, 31, American football player (New Orleans Saints).
Donald K. Fry, 84, American writer and journalism academic.
Emma Gapchenko, 83, Russian archer, Olympic bronze medalist (1972).
Fred Hiatt, 66, American journalist, editor, and columnist (The Washington Post), cardiac arrest.
Skilyr Hicks, 23, American singer-songwriter.
Thomas W. Horton, 101, New Zealand pilot (RNZAF, RAF).
Olha Ilkiv, 101, Ukrainian partisan and liaison officer (Ukrainian Insurgent Army).
Lindiwe Mabuza, 83, South African poet and politician, MP (1994–1999) and high commissioner to the United Kingdom (2001–2009).
Medina Spirit, 3, American Thoroughbred racehorse, Kentucky Derby winner (2021), heart attack.
Eugenio Minasso, 62, Italian politician, deputy (2008–2013), complications from COVID-19.
Marvin Morgan, 38, English footballer (Plymouth Argyle, Aldershot Town, Shrewsbury Town).
Jerome Lyle Rappaport, 94, American lawyer, political leader, and real estate developer.
Aldo Rebecchi, 75, Italian politician, deputy (1987–2001).
Julius S. Scott, 66, American author (The Common Wind).
Masayuki Uemura, 78, Japanese video game engineer (Nintendo).
Kåre Willoch, 93, Norwegian politician, prime minister (1981–1986), MP (1958–1989) and minister of trade (1963, 1965–1970).

7
Lionel Antoine, 71, American football player (Chicago Bears).
Aydin Balayev, 65, Azerbaijani historian and ethnologist.
Carol Jenkins Barnett, 65, American businesswoman (Publix), complications from Alzheimer's disease.
Mustafa Ben Halim, 100, Libyan politician, prime minister (1954–1957) and minister of foreign affairs (1954–1956).
Steve Bronski, 61, Scottish keyboardist (Bronski Beat), smoke inhalation.
Raja Collure, 83, Sri Lankan politician, MP (2000–2004) and governor of Uva (since 2019), COVID-19.
Lamine Dieng, 70, Senegalese football manager (AS Douanes, ASC Niarry Tally, national team).
Catherine Fournier, 66, French politician, senator (since 2017).
Geoffrey Harcourt, 90, Australian economist.
Joe Hernandez, 81, American football player (Toronto Argonauts, Edmonton Eskimos, Washington Redskins), COVID-19.
Sir Christopher Hogg, 85, British business executive, chairman of GlaxoSmithKline (2002–2004).
Pavel Hůla, 69, Czech classical violinist (Kocian Quartet, Pražák Quartet) and music educator.
Suresh Jadhav, 72, Indian biotechnology executive, renal failure.
Yury Karabasov, 82, Russian professor and politician, member of the State Duma (2007–2011).
Nanda Prusty, 102, Indian teacher, COVID-19.
Matt Scherer, 38, American track and field athlete.
Philippe Stevens, 84, Belgian Roman Catholic prelate, bishop of Maroua-Makolo (1994–2014).
Greg Tate, 64, American music critic (The Village Voice) and musician (Burnt Sugar), co-founder of the Black Rock Coalition.
Michel Thierry, 93, French industrialist.
Claude Vandersleyen, 94, Belgian Egyptologist.

8
Chris Achilleos, 74, Cypriot-born British illustrator.
Bruce Arden, 94, American computer scientist.
Hal E. Broxmeyer, 77, American microbiologist, thyroid cancer.
Sylwester Chęciński, 91, Polish film and television director (Katastrofa, Sami swoi, Kochaj albo rzuć).
Kristina Đukić, 21, Serbian YouTuber, suicide.
Tapulesatele Mauteni Esera, Samoan politician, MLA (2016–2021).
Gerry Foley, 89, American-Canadian ice hockey player (New York Rangers, Toronto Maple Leafs, Los Angeles Kings).
Mitsutoshi Furuya, 85, Japanese manga artist (Dame Oyaji, Bar Lemon Heart), cancer.
Igor Gamula, 61, Ukrainian-Russian football player (Zaria Voroshilovgrad, SKA Rostov-on-Don) and manager (Rostov).
Barry Harris, 91, American jazz pianist, complications from COVID-19.
Susana Higuchi, 71, Peruvian politician, deputy (2000–2006) and first lady (1990–1994), cancer.
Lars Høgh, 62, Danish football player (Odense Boldklub, national team) and coach, pancreatic cancer.
Anne Hudson, 83, British literary historian.
Mustapha El Karouni, 53, Belgian lawyer and politician, Brussels-Capital Region MP.
Blackjack Lanza, 86, American Hall of Fame professional wrestler (WWWF, WWA, AWA).
Daniel Laskin, 97, American surgeon and educator.
Richie Lewis, 55, American baseball player (Florida Marlins, Detroit Tigers, Oakland Athletics).
Chandidas Mal, 92, Indian musician.
Farida Mammadova, 85, Azerbaijani historian.
Patricia Misslin, 81, American voice teacher and soprano.
Alfredo Moreno, 41, Argentine footballer (Celaya, Ascenso MX, Shandong Luneng), stomach cancer.
Dieter Murmann, 87, German lobbyist, chairman of the Economic Council Germany (1989–2000).
Mark Pike, 57, American football player (Buffalo Bills), non-Hodgkin lymphoma complicated by COVID-19.
Phú Quang, 72, Vietnamese composer, complications from diabetes.
Michel Quarez, 83, Syrian-born French painter and graphic artist.
Robbie Shakespeare, 68, Jamaican bassist (Sly and Robbie, Black Uhuru) and record producer, complications from kidney surgery.
John L. Sorenson, 97, American anthropologist, scholar and author.
Jan Stuifbergen, 92, Dutch politician, mayor of Heerhugowaard (1980–1994).
Malcolm Troup, 91, Canadian-born British pianist and musicologist.
Andrzej Zieliński, 85, Polish sprinter, Olympic silver medallist (1964).
Jacques Zimako, 69, French footballer (Bastia, Saint-Étienne, national team).
Notable Indian military officers killed in the Indian Air Force Mil Mi-17 crash:
Bipin Rawat, 63, chairman of the Chiefs of Staff Committee (2019), chief of defence staff (since 2020) and chief of the Army Staff (2016–2019)
Lakhbinder Singh Lidder, 52, defence assistant to Bipin Rawat

9
Danielle Adams, 38, Canadian politician, Manitoba MLA (since 2019), traffic collision.
Shamim Alam Khan, 84, Pakistani military officer, Chairman Joint Chiefs of Staff Committee (1991–1994), COVID-19.
Brian Aldridge, 81, New Zealand cricket umpire.
Don Asmussen, 59, American cartoonist (San Francisco Chronicle), brain cancer.
Billy J. Boles, 83, American general.
Julie Brougham, 67, New Zealand Olympic equestrian (2016), cancer.
Ryszard Brzuzy, 60, Polish trade unionist and politician, deputy (1989–1991).
Donald Cozzens, 82, American Roman Catholic priest, author and lecturer, complications from COVID-19.
Anthony Cullis, 75, British electronic engineer.
Garth Dennis, 72, Jamaican reggae musician (Black Uhuru, The Wailing Souls).
Speedy Duncan, 79, American football player (San Diego Chargers, Washington Redskins).
Gunter Hadwiger, 72, Austrian politician.
Luis Irizar, 91, Cuban-born Spanish chef.
Robert Jervis, 81, American political scientist.
Gertraud Jesserer, 77, Austrian actress (Eva, My Daughter and I, I Learned It from Father), house fire.
Enju Kato, 102, Japanese bhikkhu and politician, member of the Okazaki city council (1967–1984).
David Lasley, 74, American singer-songwriter.
Giosuè Ligios, 92, Italian politician, senator (1972–1983), MEP (1979–1989).
Alice McGuire, 86, Canadian politician, Yukon MLA (1978–1982).
David Mercer, 60, American political strategist and commentator, cancer.
Aleksandr Neumyvakin, 81, Russian politician, deputy (1989–1991).
Otar Patsatsia, 92, Georgian politician, prime minister (1993–1995), COVID-19.
Carmen Salinas, 82, Mexican actress (María Mercedes, Abrázame muy fuerte, Under the Same Moon) and politician, deputy (2015–2018), complications from a stroke.
Larry Sellers, 72, American actor (Dr. Quinn, Medicine Woman).
Peter Spoden, 100, German Luftwaffe fighter pilot.
Charles R. Steele, 88, American aerospace engineer.
Demaryius Thomas, 33, American football player (Denver Broncos, New York Jets, Houston Texans), Super Bowl champion (2016), seizure.
Themsie Times, 72, South African actress (Allan Quatermain and the Lost City of Gold, Dangerous Ground, Stander).
Al Unser, 82, American Hall of Fame racing driver, four-time Indianapolis 500 winner, IndyCar champion (1983, 1985), liver cancer.
Lina Wertmüller, 93, Italian film director (Seven Beauties, Love and Anarchy, Swept Away) and screenwriter.
Cara Williams, 96, American actress (The Defiant Ones, Pete and Gladys, Boomerang).
Maryse Wolinski, 78, French writer and journalist (Sud Ouest, Le Journal du Dimanche).

10
Jacques Auxiette, 81, French politician, president of the regional council of Pays de la Loire (2004–2015).
Gabriel Calvo, 66, Spanish Olympic gymnast (1976, 1980).
Romulo T. de la Cruz, 74, Filipino Roman Catholic prelate, archbishop of Zamboanga (since 2014).
Oded Muhammad Danial, 59, Indonesian politician, mayor of Bandung (since 2018).
Les Emmerson, 77, Canadian singer (Five Man Electrical Band), complications from COVID-19.
Maria Gomori, 101, Hungarian-born Canadian family therapist.
Pavel Karpf, 52, Swiss footballer (BSC Old Boys, FC Luzern), complications from a heart attack.
Constantin Năsturescu, 81, Romanian footballer (Rapid București, Progresul Brăila, national team).
Michael Nesmith, 78, American musician (The Monkees) and songwriter ("Different Drum", "Joanne"), Grammy winner (1982), heart failure.
Ken Osinde, 59, Kenyan diplomat, ambassador to Germany (2010–2014).
Jean-Claude Perrot, 93, French historian.
Enrico Pieri, 87, Italian survivor of the Sant'Anna di Stazzema massacre.
Karin Praxmarer, 77, Austrian politician, councilor (1986–1996, 1999).
Gene Prebola, 83, American football player (Oakland Raiders, Denver Broncos).
Kev Reynolds, 78, English outdoor writer.
Günther Rühle, 97, German journalist and theater critic.
Sunil Soma Peiris, 72, Sri Lankan filmmaker (Kauda Bole Alice, Pissu Puso, Ohoma Harida).
Tyler E. Stovall, 67, American historian, president of the American Historical Association (2017).
Martin Strimitzer, 93, Austrian politician, president (1990) and member (1982–1992) of the Federal Council.
Leland Wilkinson, 77, American statistician and computer scientist.

11
Janusz Bargieł, 63, Polish politician, senator (2001–2005).
Fjölnir Geir Bragason, 56, Icelandic tattoo artist.
Mecnur Çolak, 54, Bulgarian-born Turkish footballer (Ludogorets Razgrad, Sarıyer, Fenerbahçe), complications from COVID-19.
Edward Esko, 71, American macrobiotic diet advocate.
Ed Gayda, 94, American basketball player (Tri-Cities Blackhawks).
Jack Hedley, 92, British actor (The New York Ripper, For Your Eyes Only, Colditz), heart attack.
Hiroshi Hirata, 84, Japanese manga artist, heart failure.
Vera Kistiakowsky, 93, American physicist and arms control activist.
Christian Laskawiec, 69, French rugby league player (Racing Club Albi XIII, national team).
Mel Lastman, 88, Canadian politician, mayor of North York (1973–1997) and Toronto (1998–2003).
Juan Carlos Oyarzún, 70, Argentine politician, senator (1992–1998).
Jalal Pishvaian, 91, Iranian actor.
Hans Gerhard Ramler, 93, German politician, member of the Landtag of Schleswig-Holstein (1971–1987).
Anne Rice, 80, American author (The Vampire Chronicles, Lives of the Mayfair Witches), complications from a stroke.
Francisco Rodríguez Pérez, 82, Mexican politician, member (1973–1976, 1982–1985) and president (1983) of the Chamber of Deputies.
Beverly Russell, 87, British-American journalist and editor, assisted suicide.
Galina Samsova, 84, Russian ballet dancer.
Manuel Santana, 83, Spanish Hall of Fame tennis player, Wimbledon champion (1966), three-time French Open champion, Olympic champion (1968).
Mike Sharpe, 65, Bermudian Olympic sprinter (1976).
Gunnar Talsethagen, 90, Norwegian footballer (Molde) and author.
Dennis Ward, 74, Australian rugby league player (Canterbury-Bankstown Bulldogs, Manly Warringah Sea Eagles, national team), stomach cancer.
Mohamed Selim Zaki, 97, Egyptian Olympic equestrian (1952, 1956, 1960). (death announced on this date)

12
John Archer, 80, English footballer (Bournemouth & Boscombe Athletic, Port Vale, Chesterfield).
Kåre Berg, 89, Norwegian Olympic ski jumper (1960).
Sid Blanks, 80, American football player (Houston Oilers, Boston Patriots).
Piotr Bryhadzin, 72, Belarusian historian and politician, minister of education (2001–2003).
Eduardo Cavieres, 76, Chilean historian and academic.
Nai-Ni Chen, 62, Taiwanese-American choreographer and dancer, drowning.
James P. Dugan, 92, American politician, member of the New Jersey Senate (1969–1977).
Margareta Ekström, 91, Swedish author and translator.
Vicente Fernández, 81, Mexican singer ("La Derrota", "Estos Celos", "El Último Beso") and actor, multiple Grammy Award winner, complications from a fall.
Bernie Fowler, 97, American politician, member of the Maryland Senate (1983–1994).
Roland Hemond, 92, American baseball executive (Chicago White Sox, Baltimore Orioles, Arizona Diamondbacks).
Piotr Iwaszkiewicz, 62, Polish political historian and diplomat, ambassador to Uzbekistan (2015–2020).
C. K. Jain, 86, Indian civil servant, secretary general of the Lok Sabha (1992–1994), heart attack.
Byron LaBeach, 91, Jamaican Olympic sprinter (1952).
Maʻafu Tukuiʻaulahi, 66, Tongan noble and politician, MP (since 2008).
Sir Paulias Matane, 90, Papua New Guinean diplomat and public servant, governor-general (2004–2010).
Daniel Nlandu Mayi, 68, Congolese Roman Catholic prelate, auxiliary bishop of Kinshasa (1999–2008) and bishop of Matadi (2010–2021).
Stanisław Nowak, 86, Polish Roman Catholic prelate, archbishop of Częstochowa (1984–2011).
Toddy O'Sullivan, 87, Irish politician, TD (1981–1997) and lord mayor of Cork (1980–1981).
Jimoh Oyewumi, Ajagungbade III, 95, Nigerian traditional ruler, soun of Ogbomosho (since 1973).
Asha Patel, 44, Indian politician, Gujarat MLA (since 2017), complications from dengue.
Martin Quinn, 83, Irish Gaelic footballer (Meath).
Jimmy Rave, 39, American professional wrestler (NWA Wildside, TNA, ROH).
George Ryden, 81, Scottish footballer (Dundee, St Johnstone, Stirling Albion).
Silvia Sayago, 66, Argentine politician, deputy (since 2021), multiple organ failure.
Yury Sharov, 82, Russian fencer, Olympic champion (1964).
Len Thornson, 88, Canadian ice hockey player (Fort Wayne Komets, Indianapolis Chiefs, Huntington Hornets).
Tu Men, 61, Chinese actor (Genghis Khan, An End to Killing, Old Beast), esophageal cancer.
Chalard Worachat, 78, Thai activist.

13
Falco Accame, 96, Italian politician, deputy (1976–1983).
Barry Atkinson, 83, British-born Australian darts player.
Giannalberto Bendazzi, 75, Italian animation historian.
Clyde Bennett, 89, American football player (Ottawa Rough Riders).
Kevin Billington, 87, British film director (The Rise and Rise of Michael Rimmer, The Light at the Edge of the World, Interlude), cancer.
Blackberri, 76, American singer-songwriter and community activist, complications from a heart attack.
Álvaro Díaz Pérez, 70–71, Chilean economist and politician, ambassador to Brazil (2007–2010).
Verónica Forqué, 66, Spanish actress (Bajarse al moro, Kika, What Have I Done to Deserve This?), suicide.
Viktor Gnezdilov, 78, Russian politician, mayor of Nakhodka (1987–2004).
Élizabeth Herrgott, 80, French writer.
Harbans Kapoor, 75, Indian politician, member (since 1989) and speaker (2007–2012) of the Uttarakhand Legislative Assembly.
Liam Kavanagh, 86, Irish politician, TD (1969–1997), MEP (1973–1981) and minister for labour (1981–1983).
Fawzi Al-Kharafi, 76, Kuwaiti billionaire, CEO of M. A. Kharafi & Sons (since 2015).
Teuvo Kohonen, 87, Finnish computer scientist.
Lillian Luckey, 102, American baseball player (South Bend Blue Sox).
Charles R. Morris, 82, American writer (Los Angeles Times, The Wall Street Journal) and banker, complications from dementia.
Leszek Murzyn, 61, Polish politician, deputy (2001–2007).
Georgios Panagiotopoulos, 91, Greek lawyer and politician.
Pete Petcoff, 89, Canadian football player (Calgary Stampeders, Ottawa Rough Riders).
John Salt, 84, English artist.
Leonid Sharayev, 86, Ukrainian politician.
Joe Simon, 85, American soul and R&B singer ("The Chokin' Kind", "Get Down, Get Down (Get on the Floor)", "Power of Love").
Toby Slater, 42, British singer-songwriter and musician (Catch).
Sergei Solovyov, 77, Russian film director (Wild Pigeon, Assa, Black Rose Is an Emblem of Sorrow, Red Rose Is an Emblem of Love), screenwriter and producer.
Marek Szutowicz, 44, Polish football player (Lechia Gdańsk, Gedania 1922) and manager (Jaguar Gdańsk).
Józef Tejchma, 94, Polish politician, deputy prime minister (1972–1976).
Wang Xuezhen, 95, Chinese politician, party secretary of Peking University, alternate member of the 12th and 13th CCP Central Committees.

14
Muamer Abdulrab, 39, Qatari footballer (Al-Sailiya, Al Kharaitiyat, national team).
Božidar Bojović, 83, Montenegrin physician, endocrinologist, and politician, MP (1990–2005).
Phil Chen, 75, Jamaican bassist (Manzarek–Krieger, Butts Band, Rod Stewart), cancer.
Ian Cooper, 75, Australian footballer (St Kilda).
Jacques Dewatre, 85, French diplomat, officer, and politician, director-general for external security (1991–2000).
Nikolai Egorov, 100, Russian microbiologist and politician, deputy minister of higher education (1967–1988).
Riccardo Ehrman, 92, Italian journalist.
María Guðmundsdóttir, 86, Icelandic actress (The Honour of the House, Dead Snow 2: Red vs. Dead, Næturvaktin).
Audrey Henshall, 94, British archaeologist.
Ian Hetherington, 69, British businessman, co-founder of Psygnosis.
Kenny Hope, 80, Scottish football referee.
Igor Irtyshov, 49, Russian serial killer, rapist, and pedophile, heart failure. (death announced on this date)
Jethro, 73, British comedian, COVID-19.
Spyros Kapernekas, 73, Greek footballer (Olympiacos, Aris Thessaloniki).
Ken Kragen, 85, American music manager and producer ("We Are the World"), founder of Hands Across America.
Abraham Lunggana, 62, Indonesian businessman and politician, member of the Jakarta Regional People's Representative Council (2009–2018) and the DPR (2019–2021), heart attack.
Marek Moszczyński, 72, Polish politician, deputy marshal of Lower Silesian Voivodeship (2003–2004, 2006–2008).
Mustafa Murrar, 91, Palestinian writer.
Henry Orenstein, 98, Polish-born American Hall of Fame poker player and toymaker, COVID-19.
Tony Perez, 90, American boxing referee.
Bob Peters, 84, Canadian ice hockey coach (Bemidji State Beavers).
Harry Read, 97, British soldier, commissioner of the Salvation Army.
Miłogost Reczek, 60, Polish actor (Generał Nil).
Sonny Rhodes, 81, American blues singer and guitarist.
Jimmy Robson, 82, English footballer (Burnley, Barnsley, Bury).
Tadeusz Ross, 83, Polish actor and politician, MP (2007–2011), MEP (2013–2014).
Abd Al-Baqi Abd Karim Al-Sadun, 74, Iraqi military officer and politician.
Rosita Sokou, 98, Greek journalist, author, and playwright, COVID-19.
Sandra Meira Starling, 77, Brazilian politician, deputy (1991–1999).
James Wharram, 93, British sailor and yacht designer.
Daniel Widlöcher, 92, French psychiatrist and academic.
Chris Wilkinson, 76, British architect, co-founder of WilkinsonEyre.
Warren Zapol, 79, American anesthesiologist.

15
Frederick C. Baldwin, 92, Swiss-born American photographer.
Maja Beutler, 85, Swiss writer.
Nelly Commergnat, 78, French politician, deputy (1981–1986).
Juan Ignacio Campos, 71, Spanish attorney, lieutenant attorney of the Supreme Court (since 2020), cancer.
Vivian Cook, 81, British linguist.
Ernst Fivian, 90, Swiss gymnast, Olympic silver medalist (1952).
Flow La Movie, 36, Puerto Rican music producer (Ozuna, Bad Bunny), plane crash.
Bridget Hanley, 80, American actress (Here Come the Brides, Harper Valley PTA), complications from Alzheimer's disease.
Len Hauss, 79, American football player (Washington Redskins).
bell hooks, 69, American feminist author (Ain't I a Woman?, Feminist Theory: From Margin to Center, All About Love: New Visions), kidney failure.
Kim Yong-ju, 101, North Korean politician, vice president (1993–1997), vice premier (1974–1975) and head of the OGD (1959–1974). (death announced on this date)
Francisco Kröpfl, 90, Argentine composer and music theorist.
Hans Küppers, 82, German footballer (TSV 1860 Munich, 1. FC Nürnberg, national team).
Günter Lach, 67, German politician, member of the Bundestag (2009–2017).
Huguette Lachapelle, 79, Canadian politician, Quebec MLA (1981–1985).
François Lissarrague, 74, French historian and anthropologist.
Adam Łomnicki, 86, Polish evolutionary biologist.
Alceste Madeira, 77, Brazilian politician, deputy (1990–2006), traffic collision.
Willie McSeveney, 92, Scottish footballer (Motherwell, Dunfermline Athletic).
Víctor Moro, 95, Spanish economist and politician, deputy (1977–1979).
Fernando Ospina Hernández, 92, Colombian engineer and politician, deputy (1982–1986).
Ramón Regueira, 86, Spanish footballer (Caudal Deportivo, Burgos CF).
Rogério Samora, 63, Portuguese actor (Solidão, Uma Linda História de Amor, April Captains, Eccentricities of a Blonde-Haired Girl).
Frédéric Sinistra, 41, Belgian kickboxer, COVID-19.
André Souvré, 82, French basketball player (PUC, national team).
Marilee Stepan, 86, American swimmer, Olympic bronze medalist (1952).
Fayez Tarawneh, 72, Jordanian politician, prime minister (1998–1999, 2012), ambassador to the United States (1993) and chief of The Royal Hashemite Court (1998).
Jim Tobin, 76, American economist and taxpayer activist.
Lloyd L. Weinreb, 85, American law professor.
Linda Whetstone, 79, British libertarian, free market campaigner and author.
Wanda Young, 78, American singer (The Marvelettes).

16
Valentino Bellucci, 46, Italian philosopher, sociologist, and writer, heart attack.
Stéphane Bonduel, 102, Chinese-born French politician, senator (1980–1989).
Robert Cumming, 78, American artist, sculptor and photographer, complications from Parkinson's disease.
Pavle Dešpalj, 87, Croatian composer and conductor.
Yves Dreyfus, 90, French épée fencer, Olympic bronze medalist (1956, 1964).
Gérald Forton, 90, Belgian-born French comic book artist.
Bert Fragner, 80, Austrian Iranologist.
George Gekas, 91, American politician, member of the United States House of Representatives (1983–2003).
Lucía Hiriart, 98, Chilean socialite, first lady (1974–1990), heart failure.
Hub, 62, American bass guitarist (The Roots), multiple myeloma.
Stefan Keil, 63, German diplomat, ambassador to Jamaica (since 2021), heart attack.
Hiroshi Kuwashima, 89, Japanese politician, mayor of Morioka (1995–2003).
Baruch A. Levine, 91, American biblical scholar (New York University).
Bill Mahoney, 82, Canadian ice hockey coach (Minnesota North Stars), complications from dementia.
Vasily Michurin, 105, Belarusian colonel.
Taniela Moa, 36, Tongan rugby union player (Auckland, Section Paloise, national team).
Peter Mulholland, 68, Australian rugby league coach, non-Hodgkin's lymphoma.
Duma Nkosi, 64, South African politician, MP (1994–2001) and mayor of Ekurhuleni (2001–2008).
Trevor Pinch, 69, British sociologist, cancer.
Robie Porter, 80, Australian musician and record producer.
Edith Prague, 96, American politician, member of the Connecticut House of Representatives (1982–1990) and Senate (1994–2012).
Muhammad al-Qudwa, 75, Palestinian politician, governor of the Gaza Governorate (1996–2014).
Rusmono, 78, Indonesian military doctor.
Alan B. Scott, 89, American ophthalmologist, developer of botulinum toxin.
Manuel Seco, 93, Spanish lexicographer, linguist and philologist.
Victor Sillon, 93, French Olympic pole vaulter (1948, 1956, 1960).
Bob Speller, 65, Canadian politician, MP (1988–2004) and minister of agriculture and agri-food (2003–2004).
Jacques Timmermans, 76, Belgian politician, MP (1987–1991), senator (1991–1995).
Ben Tollefson, 94, American politician, member of the North Dakota House of Representatives (1985–2000) and Senate (2000–2008).
Bogalay Tint Aung, 99, Burmese film director (Nge Kywan Swe) and composer.
Sérgio Vieira, 80, Mozambican politician and poet.

17
Hussaini Akwanga, 77, Nigerian politician, minister of labour and productivity (2003).
Eve Babitz, 78, American visual artist and author.
Sa'dulla Begaliyev, 66–67, Uzbek politician, hokim of Andijan Region (2004–2006).
Lalage Bown, 94, English educator and women's literacy advocate.
Chen Sung-young, 80, Taiwanese actor (City of Sadness, The Dull Ice Flower, Dust of Angels).
Gabriel Cohn-Bendit, 85, French-Burkinabè activist and teacher.
Doug Ericksen, 52, American politician, member of the Washington House of Representatives (1999–2011) and Senate (since 2011), COVID-19.
José Pablo Feinmann, 78, Argentine philosopher, writer (Últimos días de la víctima) and playwright (Eva Perón: The True Story, Ay Juancito), complications from a stroke.
José Fernández Arteaga, 88, Mexican Roman Catholic prelate, archbishop of Chihuahua (1991–2009) and bishop of Apatzingán (1974–1980) and Colima (1980–1988).
Majid Al Futtaim, 86–87, Emirati businessman, founder of the Majid Al Futtaim Group.
Alexander Garvin, 80, American urban planner.
Dah Sagbadjou Glele, 90s, Beninese royal, king of Dahomey (since 2019).
Herb Guenther, 80, American politician, member of the Arizona House of Representatives (1987–1993) and senate (1999–2003).
Raymond Guth, 97, American film and television actor (Gunsmoke, Death Valley Days, Bonanza).
Bill Hill, 81, English geneticist, co-discoverer of the Hill–Robertson effect.
Harry Jacobs, 84, American football player (Boston Patriots, Buffalo Bills, New Orleans Saints).
R. L. Jalappa, 96, Indian politician, minister of textiles (1996–1998) and MP (1996–2009).
Perko Kolevski, 76, Macedonian politician, minister of health (1991–1992).
John Mitchinson, 89, English operatic tenor.
Frank Mula, 71, American television writer and producer (The Simpsons, Cosby, Life with Bonnie), Emmy winner (2000, 2001).
Mladen Naletilić Tuta, 75, Bosnian paramilitary commander and convicted war criminal.
Rafik Petrosyan, 81, Armenian politician, member of the National Assembly (1990–1995, 2003–2012).
Burt Prelutsky, 81, American television writer (M*A*S*H, Diagnosis: Murder, Dragnet).
Árpád Pusztai, 91, Hungarian-born British biochemist and nutritionist (Pusztai affair).
Yurii Reshetnyak, 92, Russian mathematician and academician.
Russell Maroon Shoatz, 78, American militant (Black Liberation Army) and convicted murderer, colorectal cancer.
Torhild Staahlen, 74, Norwegian opera singer.
Dimitrios Stefanakos, 85, Greek footballer (Olympiacos, national team).
Filippo Tasso, 81, Italian footballer (Roma, Sambenedettese, Lecce).
Greg Tebbutt, 64, Canadian ice hockey player (Pittsburgh Penguins).
Trevor Thompson, 66, English football player (Lincoln City, Newport County) and manager (Boston Town). (death announced on this date)
Klaus Wagenbach, 91, German author and publisher.

18
Harry Azhar Azis, 65, Indonesian economist and politician, MP (2004–2014) and chairman of the Audit Board (2014–2017).
Tawfik Bahri, 69, Tunisian actor.
Osagi Bascome, 23, Bermudian footballer (Darlington, national team), stabbed.
Laurent Bouvet, 53, French political scientist, complications from amyotrophic lateral sclerosis.
Custom, 54, Canadian-American musician, cardiac arrest.
Ladislav Falta, 85, Czech sport shooter, Olympic silver medallist (1972).
Jan Fransz, 84, Dutch footballer (Ajax, Haarlem).
Manuel Garza González, 88, Mexican politician, deputy (1991–1994, 2000–2003).
Krystyna Gozdawa-Nocoń, 72, Polish politician, deputy voivode of Pomeranian Voivodeship (2003–2006).
Bernd Grimmer, 71, German politician, member of the Landtag of Baden-Württemberg (since 2016), COVID-19.
Enzo Gusman, 74, Maltese singer.
Issa Kassim Issa, 54, Tanzanian politician, MP (2005–2010).
Sayaka Kanda, 35, Japanese actress (School Wars: Hero, Saraba Kamen Rider Den-O: Final Countdown) and singer, fall.
Kangol Kid, 55, American rapper and songwriter (UTFO), colon cancer.
Pierre Lepape, 80, French journalist, writer, and literary critic.
Hans Mark, 92, German-born American aerospace engineer, secretary of the Air Force (1979–1981).
Renée Martel, 74, Canadian singer, pneumonia.
Terry McManus, 75, Canadian singer-songwriter.
Joan Murray, 84, American journalist.
G. T. Nanavati, 86, Indian jurist, justice of the Supreme Court (1995–2000), heart attack.
Bagrat Oghanian, 40, Armenian boxer.
Tilman Pünder, 88, German politician, Regierungspräsident of Giessen (1987–1989).
Louis-Ferdinand de Rocca Serra, 85, French politician, senator (1994–2001).
Richard Rogers, Baron Rogers of Riverside, 88, Italian-born British architect (Centre Pompidou, Lloyd's building, Millennium Dome).
Olina Storsand, 99, Norwegian politician, member of the Storting (1965–1977).
Robert Venables Sr., 88, American politician, member of the Delaware Senate (1989–2015).
David Wagoner, 95, American poet and novelist.
Eliezer Waldman, 84, Israeli Orthodox rabbi and politician, MK (1984–1990).

19
Boško Abramović, 70, Serbian chess grandmaster.
Ron Anderson, 75, American vocal coach (Axl Rose, Chris Cornell, Ozzy Osbourne).
Ian Barker, 86, Australian barrister.
Alan Cardy, 76, Australian rugby union player (national team).
Dick Carson, 92, American television director (Wheel of Fortune, The Merv Griffin Show, The Tonight Show).
Billy Conway, 65, American drummer (Morphine, Treat Her Right), cancer.
Judith Davidoff, 94, American violist and cellist.
Drakeo the Ruler, 28, American rapper, stabbed.
Kurt Edler, 71, German politician, member of the Hamburg Parliament (1985–1986, 1993–1997).
Spartak Elmazi, 34, Albanian footballer (Pogradeci, Tomori, Dinamo Tirana).
Antoine Faivre, 87, French literary scholar and occultist.
Nicholas Georgiade, 88, American actor (The Untouchables).
Carie Graves, 68, American rower, Olympic champion (1984).
Jake Grey, 37, Samoan rugby union player (national team).
Robert H. Grubbs, 79, American chemist (Grubbs catalyst), Nobel Prize laureate (2005).
Oleg Haslavsky, 73, Russian poet and translator.
Earle Herrera, 72, Venezuelan journalist and politician, deputy (since 2017).
Sally Ann Howes, 91, English actress (Chitty Chitty Bang Bang, Brigadoon, The Admirable Crichton) and singer.
Johnny Isakson, 76, American politician, member of the U.S. House (1999–2005), Senate (2005–2019) and Georgia House of Representatives (1977–1991), Parkinson's disease.
Madhur Kapila, 79, Indian novelist and literary critic, cardiac arrest.
Kim Moon-ki, 89, South Korean politician, MP (1985–1996).
Anita Lallande, 72, Puerto Rican Olympic swimmer (1964).
Andrei Malyukov, 73, Russian film director (In the Zone of Special Attention, Express on Fire, Black Hunters) and screenwriter, COVID-19.
Carlos Marín, 53, German-born Spanish singer (Il Divo), COVID-19.
Ignacio Martín Amaro, 77, Spanish politician, senator (1982–1986). (death announced on this date)
Aníbal Meléndez Rivera, 73, Puerto Rican politician, mayor of Fajardo (1989–2020).
Juan Norat, 77, Spanish footballer (Pontevedra CF, CD Ourense).
Gérard Poirier, 91, Canadian actor (The Heat Line, Matusalem, Stay with Me).
Russ Potts, 82, American politician, member of the Virginia Senate (1992–2008).
Frans Lebu Raya, 61, Indonesian politician, governor of East Nusa Tenggara (2008–2018).
Curt Ridley, 70, Canadian ice hockey player (Vancouver Canucks, Toronto Maple Leafs, New York Rangers).
Elio Roca, 78, Argentine singer and actor (Love in Flight), heart failure.
Adam Rosen, 37, American-born British Olympic luger (2006, 2010, 2018), cancer.
Vytautas Straižys, 85, Lithuanian astronomer.
Robert Strichartz, 78, American mathematician.
Ed van Thijn, 87, Dutch politician, MP (1967–1983), minister of the interior (1981–1982, 1994), mayor of Amsterdam (1983–1994).
Chowdhury Akmal Ibne Yusuf, 75, Bangladeshi politician, MP (1996, 2002–2008).

20
Fred Andrews, 69, American baseball player (Philadelphia Phillies).
Luboš Andršt, 73, Czech guitarist (Framus Five, Energit, Jazz Q) and composer.
Viktor Antikhovich, 76, Russian football player (Druzhba Yoshkar-Ola, Rubin Kazan) and manager (Krylia Sovetov).
Kimera Bartee, 49, American baseball player (Detroit Tigers) and coach (Pittsburgh Pirates, Philadelphia Phillies), complications from a brain tumour.
Heinz Bigler, 72, Swiss footballer (FC St. Gallen).
Norberto Boggio, 90, Argentine footballer (Atlante).
Anthony W. Bradley, 87, British barrister, academic and expert in UK constitutional law.
Jorge Busti, 74, Argentine politician, three-time governor of Entre Ríos Province, senator (2001–2003) and deputy (1999–2001).
Jiří Čadek, 86, Czech footballer (Dukla Prague).
Pierre Cassignard, 56, French actor (The Conquest, A French Woman, Seventh Heaven), cancer.
Mamadú Iaia Djaló, c. 59, Bissau-Guinean politician, minister of justice (2018–2019) and foreign affairs (2000–2001).
Elizabeth Fennema, 93, American educator.
Giuseppe Galante, 84, Italian rower, Olympic silver medallist (1960, 1964).
Hasan Irlu, 61-62, Iranian diplomat.
Asma Khader, 69, Jordanian politician, minister of culture (2004–2005), senator (2014–2015).
Jean-Paul Laumond, 68, French robotician.
Sarat Kumar Mukhopadhyay, 90, Indian poet and translator, cardiac arrest.
Willard H. Murray Jr., 90, American politician, member of the California State Assembly (1988–1996).
Christopher Newton, 85, Canadian actor and director.
Reinier Paping, 90, Dutch speed skater, Elfstedentocht winner (1963).
Jack Paradise, 96, American pediatrician.
Michał Rokicki, 37, Polish Olympic swimmer (2008).
Mushtari Shafi, 83, Bangladeshi writer, liver disease.
Jack Whillock, 79, American baseball player (Detroit Tigers).
Umar Zahir, 85, Maldivian politician, minister of sports (1988–1993) and public works (1993–2004), COVID-19.

21
George Alexander Albrecht, 86, German conductor (Staatsoper Hannover), composer and musicologist.
Chen Niannian, 80, Chinese nuclear engineer, member of the Chinese Academy of Engineering.
Jaime Comas, 85, Spanish screenwriter (A Fistful of Dollars, The Shark Hunter, The Glass Sphinx).
John Galbraith, 98, American politician, member of the Ohio House of Representatives (1967–1986).
Sir Carlyle Glean, 89, Grenadian politician, governor-general (2008–2013).
P. A. Ibrahim Haji, 78, Indian entrepreneur.
Ivan Hopta, 63, Slovak politician, member of the National Council (2002–2006).
Muhammad Yusuf Islahi, 89, Indian Islamic scholar.
Vassos Karageorghis, 92, Cypriot archaeologist.
Eberhard Mahle, 88, German racing driver.
Myrna Manzanares, 75, Belizean cultural activist.
Ian Matos, 32, Brazilian Olympic diver (2016), lung infection.
Geneviève Meurgues, 91, French explorer and botanist.
Christian Ouellet, 87, Canadian politician, MP (2006–2011).
Gary Lee Sampson, 62, American spree killer.
Osman Sapian, 69, Malaysian politician, Johor MLA (1999–2013, since 2018) and Menteri Besar (2018–2019), stroke.
Tahir Shamsi, 59, Pakistani hematologist, stroke.
George Sheltz, 75, American Roman Catholic prelate, auxiliary bishop of Galveston-Houston (2012–2021).
Nkodo Sitony, 62, Cameroonian singer.
Liv Thorsen, 86, Norwegian actress (Mot i brøstet).
Anthony Williams, 90, Trinidadian steelpan musician and designer, complications from COVID-19.

22
Edgar H. Brown, 94, American mathematician.
Alessandro Casse, 75, Italian alpine skier.
Mava Chou, 32, Swiss influencer.
Richard Conway, 79, English visual effects artist (The Adventures of Baron Munchausen, Brazil, Sunshine).
Dansili, 25, British thoroughbred racehorse and sire.
Antonio Falconio, 83, Italian politician, deputy (1979–1983), president of Abruzzo (1995–2000).
Lester E. Fisher, 100, American zoologist, director of Lincoln Park Zoo (1962–1992).
Vicente de la Fuente García, 87, Spanish politician, mayor of Betanzos (1979–1983).
Robert Holland, 81, American business executive, CEO of Ben & Jerry's (1995–1996).
Egill Skúli Ingibergsson, 95, Icelandic politician, mayor of Reykjavík (1978–1982).
George Keiser, 75, American politician, member of the North Dakota House of Representatives (since 1992), complications from amyotrophic lateral sclerosis.
Bob Keselowski, 70, American racing driver (NASCAR), cancer.
Thomas Kinsella, 93, Irish poet, translator, and editor.
Corporal Kirchner, 64, American professional wrestler (WWF, NJPW, W*ING), heart attack.
Robin Le Mesurier, 68, British guitarist (The Wombles), cancer.
Serge Lentz, 87, French writer and journalist.
Frédéric Manns, 79, French biblist.
Thandatha Jongilizwe Mabandla, 95, South African tribal leader, chief executive councillor (1968–1972) and chief minister (1972–1973) of Ciskei.
Poh Lip Meng, 52, Singaporean sport shooter.
Barbara Shaw, 79, American politician, member of the New Hampshire House of Representatives (since 2010), complications from surgery.
Ivan Shilov, 91, Russian politician, Soviet deputy minister of internal affairs (1988–1991).
Franklin A. Thomas, 87, American community developer and philanthropist, president and CEO of the Ford Foundation (1979–1996).
P. T. Thomas, 71, Indian politician, MP (2009–2014) and three-time Kerala MLA, cancer.
Gilberto Valbuena Sánchez, 92, Mexican Roman Catholic prelate, bishop of Colima (1989–2005).
Eddie Wallace, 71, Irish football player and manager (Athlone Town).
Jürg Wyttenbach, 86, Swiss composer and pianist.
Dmitry Zimin, 88, Russian radio scientist and businessman, founder of VimpelCom.

23
Zubir Amin, 82, Indonesian diplomat, ambassador to Madagascar (1979–1982) and Turkey (1982–1984).
Dan Berindei, 98, Romanian historian.
Robert J. Birnbaum, 94, American financial executive, president of the American (1977–1985) and New York Stock Exchanges (1985–1988).
Francis Boisson, 93, Monégasque Olympic sports shooter (1960, 1972).
Ted Byfield, 93, Canadian journalist and publisher, founder of Alberta Report and BC Report.
Chung Ung, 93, South Korean politician, member of the National Assembly (1988–1992).
Eugeniusz Czepiel, 92, Polish beekeeper and politician, MP (1981–1985).
Bernard Dewulf, 61, Belgian poet and journalist.
Chris Dickerson, 82, American bodybuilder, Mr. Olympia (1982).
Joan Didion, 87, American writer (Run, River, Slouching Towards Bethlehem, The Year of Magical Thinking), complications from Parkinson's disease.
Karen Ferguson, 80, American workers' rights advocate, founder of Pension Rights Center, cancer.
Roberto Gerlein Echeverría, 83, Colombian politician, deputy (1968–1974), senator (1976–2018) and minister of economic development (1982–1983), complications from urinary tract infection.
Lars Eighner, 73, American writer.
Donald H. Elliott, 89, American urban planner.
Bob McCammon, 80, Canadian ice hockey coach and executive (Vancouver Canucks, Philadelphia Flyers).
Grace Mirabella, 91, American magazine editor, editor-in-chief of Vogue (1971–1988) and founder of Mirabella.
Sharyn Moffett, 85, American actress (My Pal Wolf, The Body Snatcher, Mr. Blandings Builds His Dream House).
Patrick N'Guema N'Dong, 64, Gabonese journalist.
Françoise Nuñez, 64, French photographer.
Bartolomeo Pepe, 59, Italian politician, senator (2013–2018), COVID-19.
Keith Rae, 104, Australian footballer (Carlton, Richmond).
Benito Rigoni, 85, Italian bobsledder, Olympic bronze medalist (1964).
Omar Saavedra Santis, 77, Chilean writer.
Stanley M. Truhlsen, 101, American ophthalmologist.
Francisco Valada, 80, Portuguese Olympic cyclist (1960).
Dragan Vujadinović, 68, Serbian politician, economist, and journalist, deputy (2007–2009) and mayor of Kosjerić (2009–2012).
Louie L. Wainwright, 98, American corrections administrator.
Elżbieta Żebrowska, 76, Polish Olympic hurdler (1968).

24
Bill Attewell, 89, Canadian politician, MP (1984–1993).
Meor Yusof Aziddin, 54, Malaysian folk singer, COVID-19.
Boss Ko, 47, Burmese politician, acting chief minister of Kayah State (since 2020) and member of the Kayah State Hluttaw (since 2016).
Shirley Bottolfsen, 87, Irish philanthropist.
Jozef Burian, 60, Slovak politician, member of the National Council (2002–2020), minister of labor, social affairs, and family (2012–2016).
J. D. Crowe, 84, American banjo player and bluegrass band leader (New South).
Norman R. DeBlieck, 95, American politician, member of the Minnesota House of Representatives (1987–1989).
Harvey Evans, 80, American actor (West Side Story, Bank Shot, Enchanted).
Tesfaye Gebreab, 53, Eritrean writer.
Gwendolyn Killebrew, 80, American operatic contralto (Deutsche Oper am Rhein).
Willibert Kremer, 82, German football player (Viktoria Köln, Hertha BSC, MSV Duisburg) and coach.
Ganeshwar Kusum, 87, Indian politician, MP (1984–1990).
Joycelynne Loncke, 80, Guyanese academic.
Oscar López Ruiz, 83, Argentine composer, record producer and guitarist.
Paul Lyall, 77, British table tennis player, Paralympic champion (1964, 1968).
Raúl Madero, 82, Argentine footballer (Boca Juniors, Estudiantes, national team).
Vojvoda Malesija, 51, Montenegrin football player (Zeta, Radnički Niš, Elista) and manager.
Anthony May, 75, British actor (Man on Horseback, Cromwell, No Blade of Grass).
Terry Morrison, 70, New Zealand rugby union player (Otago, national team), heart attack.
Deborah Nickerson, 67, American geneticist, abdominal cancer.
Ron Page, 70, Australian footballer (Williamstown, South Melbourne).
Ram Krushna Patnaik, 81, Indian politician, six-time Odisha MLA.
Wolfgang Pfahl, 74, German politician, member of the Bürgerschaft of Bremen (1997–2007).
K. V. Raju, 67, Indian film director and screenwriter (Yuddha Kaanda, Indrajith, Indrajeet).
Clark Richert, 80, American artist.
K. S. Sethumadhavan, 90, Indian film director (Oppol, Panitheeratha Veedu, Karakanakadal) and screenwriter.
Vladimir Tatosov, 95, Russian actor (Intervention, Failure of Engineer Garin, The Twentieth Century Approaches), COVID-19.
Jim Teal, 71, American football player (Detroit Lions).
Birgit Vanderbeke, 65, German writer.
José Villegas, 87, Mexican footballer (Guadalajara, national team).
Gunaratna Weerakoon, 74, Sri Lankan politician, MP (2004–2015).

25
Madhavan Ayyappath, 87, Indian poet and translator.
Princess Maryam Begum, 85, Afghan princess.
Carmen Bourassa, 79, Canadian television producer (Passe-Partout).
Eric Cockeram, 97, British politician, MP (1970–1974, 1979–1987).
Harry Colomby, 92, German-born American talent manager (Michael Keaton) and screenwriter (Johnny Dangerously, Working Stiffs), complications from a fall.
Bruce Davis, 65, American football player (Oakland/Los Angeles Raiders, Houston Oilers).
Jacques Drillon, 67, French writer and journalist, cancer.
John Gleeson, 82, Australian rugby league player (Wynnum-Manly, Queensland, national team).
Guenshi Ever, Beninese singer.
Naren Gupta, 73, Indian venture capital investor.
Ray Illingworth, 89, English cricketer (Yorkshire, Leicestershire, national team), oesophageal cancer.
Edy Korthals Altes, 97, Dutch diplomat.
Brij Lal, 69, Fijian historian.
Albert Likhanov, 86, Russian writer and screenwriter (Team 33).
Janice Long, 66, English disc jockey (BBC Radio 1, BBC Radio Wales) and television presenter (Top of the Pops), pneumonia.
Thomas Lovejoy, 80, American ecologist, pancreatic cancer.
Richard Marcinko, 81, American naval officer, commander of SEAL Team Six (1980–1983), heart attack.
Roy Miller, 86, British academic and educator, principal of Royal Holloway, University of London (1982–1985).
Candy Palmater, 53, Canadian comedian, broadcaster (Definitely Not the Opera), and actress (Trailer Park Boys).
Colin Philp Jr., 57, Fijian Olympic sailor (1988).
Jonathan Spence, 85, English-born American historian and sinologist, complications from Parkinson's disease.
Wayne Thiebaud, 101, American painter.
Jean-Marc Vallée, 58, Canadian film and television director (Dallas Buyers Club, The Young Victoria, Big Little Lies), Emmy winner (2017), cardiac arrhythmia stemming from atherosclerosis.
Ralph Warburton, 97, American Olympic ice hockey player (1948).
Guido Weiss, 92, Italian-born American mathematician.

26
Gary B. Beikirch, 74, American combat medic, Medal of Honor recipient.
Bruce Bromberg, 80, American record producer.
Giacomo Capuzzi, 92, Italian Roman Catholic prelate, bishop of Lodi (1989–2005).
Denis J. Hickie, 78, Irish rugby union player (Leinster, national team, Barbarians).
Steve Jenkins, 69, American author, splenic artery aneurysm.
Paul B. Kidd, 76, Australian radio broadcaster (2UE, 2GB) and writer, cancer and heart disease.
Henri Losch, 90, Luxembourgish actor, screenwriter, and linguist.
Fred McLafferty, 98, American chemist (McLafferty rearrangement).
Mameve Medwed, 79, American novelist.
Diego Montiel, 25, Argentine footballer (Atlético de Rafaela, Juventud Unida), meningitis.
Karolos Papoulias, 92, Greek politician, president (2005–2015), deputy (1977–2004) and minister of foreign affairs (1985–1989, 1993–1996).
Phua Bah Lee, 89, Singaporean politician, MP (1968–1988).
Dorval Rodrigues, 86, Brazilian footballer (Santos, Paranaense, national team).
Agustín Saavedra Weise, 78, Bolivian diplomat and writer, president of the Central Bank (2020) and foreign minister (1982).
Desmond Tutu, 90, South African Anglican prelate and civil rights activist, bishop of Johannesburg (1985–1986) and archbishop of Cape Town (1986–1996), Nobel Prize laureate (1984).
Manikka Vinayagam, 78, Indian playback singer (Kannathil Muthamittal, Roja Kootam) and actor (Thiruda Thirudi), heart attack.
Barclay Wade, 77, Australian Olympic rower (1964).
Sarah Weddington, 76, American attorney (Roe v. Wade) and politician, member of the Texas House of Representatives (1973–1977) and White House political director (1979–1981).
Grzegorz Więzik, 58, Polish footballer (Łódź, Mulhouse, Viborg).
Jim Wiley, 71, Canadian ice hockey player (Pittsburgh Penguins, Vancouver Canucks) and coach (San Jose Sharks).
E. O. Wilson, 92, American biologist (Sociobiology: The New Synthesis) and writer (On Human Nature, Consilience), Pulitzer Prize winner (1979, 1991).

27
April Ashley, 86, English model, actress (The Road to Hong Kong), and writer.
Jeanine Baude, 75, French poet and writer.
Andreas Behm, 59, German weightlifter, Olympic bronze medalist (1992), heart attack.
Earl Best, 74, American activist and convicted bank robber, cancer.
Naren Chandra Das, 83, Indian soldier, escorted the 14th Dalai Lama from Tibet in 1959.
Defao, 62, Congolese singer-songwriter, COVID-19.
Patsy Dorgan, 85, Irish footballer (Blackburn Rovers, Cork Hibernians, Cork Celtic F.C.).
Raymond Fau, 85, French singer-songwriter.
Carlo Franciosi, 86, Sammarinese politician, Captain Regent (1987).
Howard Fredeen, 100, Canadian animal breeding researcher.
Norman Freeman, 90, American Olympic sailor (1976).
Paul Carter Harrison, 85, American playwright.
Joynal Hazari, 76, Bangladeshi politician, MP (1991–2001).
Keri Hulme, 74, New Zealand writer (The Bone People) and poet.
Arlo Hullinger, 100, American politician, member of the Iowa House of Representatives (1965–1981).
Fariz Musa, 51, Malaysian politician, COVID-19.
Peter Pike, 84, British politician, MP (1983–2005).
Mahendra Prasad, 81, Indian politician, MP (since 1985).
Robert Preston, 92, American politician, member of the New Hampshire Senate (1964–1966, 1972–1990).
Jim Sherwin, 81, Irish rugby commentator.
Graham Skidmore, 90, British voice artist and announcer (Blind Date, Shooting Stars).
Victor Socaciu, 68, Romanian folk singer, composer and politician, deputy (2008–2012).
José Chemo Soto, 78, Puerto Rican politician, mayor of Canóvanas (1993–2014).
Akram Toofani, 90–91, Pakistani Islamic scholar. (death announced on this date)
Raymond Viskanta, 90, Lithuanian engineer.
Chaim Walder, 53, Israeli rabbi and author, suicide by gunshot.
Myrna Williams, 92, American politician, member of the Nevada Assembly (1985–1993) and Clark County commissioner (1995–2007).

28
Kane Hamidou Baba, 67, Mauritanian politician, MP (2006–2013), traffic collision.
Grichka Bogdanoff, 72, French television presenter and academic fraudster (Bogdanov affair), COVID-19.
John Bowman, 64, American television writer (Martin, Saturday Night Live, In Living Color).
Caliadi, 56, Indonesian civil servant, heart and kidney disease.
James Cayne, 87, American businessman, CEO of Bear Stearns (1993–2008).
Mikey Chung, 71, Jamaican musician and arranger, myeloma.
Michael R. Clifford, 69, American astronaut (STS-53, STS-59, STS-76), complications from Parkinson's disease.
Mary Fairhurst, 64, American jurist, chief justice of the Washington Supreme Court (2017–2020), cancer.
Ted Gardner, 74, Australian music manager, co-founder of Lollapalooza.
William Gorham, 91, American economist.
Luis Guastavino, 89, Chilean politician, intendant of the Valparaíso Region (2003–2006) and deputy (1965–1973).
Stanislav Huml, 66, Czech police officer and politician, MP (2010–2017).
Tony Jefferies, 73, British motorcycle road racer.
Bill Lyall, 79–80, Canadian politician and businessman, member of the Northern Territory Legislative Assembly (1975–1979).
John Madden, 85, American Hall of Fame football coach (Oakland Raiders) and sportscaster (NFL on CBS, NFL on Fox), Super Bowl champion (1977).
Hugo Maradona, 52, Argentine footballer (Rayo Vallecano, Sagan Tosu, Hokkaido Consadole Sapporo), heart attack.
Thomas Milani, 69, Canadian-born Italian ice hockey player (Minnesota Fighting Saints, Kalamazoo Wings, Italy national team).
Annie Chidzira Muluzi, 69, Malawian first lady (1994–1999), cancer.
Wojciech Niemiec, 65, Polish footballer (Stal Mielec, Legia Warsaw, Stal Stalowa Wola).
P. Buford Price, 89, American physicist.
Harry Reid, 82, American politician, member of the U.S. Senate (1987–2017) and House of Representatives (1983–1987), pancreatic cancer.
Edward Shaske, 94, Canadian Olympic sports shooter (1968).
Nikolay Shirshov, 47, Uzbek footballer (Pakhtakor Tashkent, Rostov, national team).
David Sidorsky, 94, American philosopher.
Mary Alice Thatch, 78, American newspaper editor.
Tibi, 70, Portuguese footballer (Leixões, Porto, national team).
Chris Wall, 79, Irish politician, senator (2007).
Ananda Weerasekara, 78, Sri Lankan military officer and Buddhist monk, commanding officer of the North Central Province.
Sabine Weiss, 97, Swiss-French photographer.
Don Whitten, 86, Australian footballer (Footscray, Yarraville).
Stanislav Zavidonov, 87, Russian football player (Zenit Leningrad) and manager (ASM Oran).

29
Simão Almeida, 77, Brazilian politician, Paraíba MLA (1991–1995), complications from COVID-19.
Ricardo Bellveser, 73, Spanish writer and journalist, cancer.
Antoine Bonifaci, 90, French footballer (Nice, Torino, national team).
Sue Cline, 75, American politician, member of the West Virginia Senate (2016–2020).
Ahmed Daham, 54, Iraqi football player (Al-Naft, national team) and manager (Naft Maysan), heart attack.
Lloyd van Dams, 49, Surinamese-born Dutch kickboxer, heart disease.
Chris Eitzmann, 45, American football player (New England Patriots, Green Bay Packers).
Mohammed Fareeduddin, 64, Indian politician, Telangana MLC (since 2016), cardiac arrest.
Nino Filastò, 83, Italian lawyer and writer.
Bianca Garavelli, 63, Italian writer and literary critic.
Paolo Giordano, 59, Italian guitarist, COVID-19.
Ignace Guédé-Gba, 57, Ivorian footballer (Africa Sports, Gazélec Ajaccio, national team).
Christian Gyan, 43, Ghanaian footballer (Feyenoord, national team), cancer.
John Hartman, 72, American Hall of Fame drummer (The Doobie Brothers).
Clemente Iriarte, 75, Spanish footballer (Burgos, Real Oviedo, Osasuna).
Peter Klatzow, 76, South African composer and pianist.
Ralph W. Klein, 85, American Biblical scholar (LSTC) and pastor (ELCA).
Pupetta Maresca, 86, Italian beauty queen, mobster and convicted murderer.
Lee C. McDonald, 96, American political scientist.
Alfonso Mejía, 87, Mexican actor (Los Olvidados, Vacations in Acapulco, The Boxer).
William Moncrief, 101, American petroleum executive.
Kaithapram Viswanathan Namboothiri, 58, Indian film score composer (Kaliyattam, Kannaki, Thilakkam), cancer.
Steve Peplow, 72, English footballer (Swindon Town, Tranmere Rovers).
Lluís Raluy, 79, Spanish clown and circus director, complications from Parkinson's disease.
Nancy Worley, 70, American politician, secretary of state of Alabama (2003–2007).

30
George Brenner, 92, Australian politician, NSW MLC (1981–1991).
Vladimir Gorikker, 96, Russian film director and screenwriter (Mozart and Salieri, The Tsar's Bride).
Billy Harrison, 83, New Zealand rugby league player (Wellington, national team).
Ron Jones, 87, British Olympic sprinter (1964, 1968).
Sam Jones, 88, American Hall of Fame basketball player (Boston Celtics), ten-time NBA champion.
Stephen J. Lawrence, 82, American composer (Sesame Street, Bang the Drum Slowly, Alice, Sweet Alice), multiple organ failure.
Karel Loprais, 72, Czech rally raid driver, six-time winner of the Dakar Rally, COVID-19.
Lya Luft, 83, Brazilian writer, cancer.
Wolfgang Müller, 90, German Olympic equestrian (1968, 1972).
Bill Noonan, 74, New Zealand rugby league player (Canterbury-Bankstown Bulldogs, Newtown Jets, national team).
Denis O'Dell, 98, British film producer (The Magic Christian, The Offence, The Ritz).
Renato Scarpa, 82, Italian actor (The Postman, Don't Look Now, The Icicle Thief), heart attack.
Jean Vassieux, 72, French ice hockey player (Ours de Villard-de-Lans, national team).
Joseph W. Wenzel, 88, American academic, complications from a stroke.

31
Gaber Asfour, 77, Egyptian academic and politician, minister of culture (2011, 2014–2015).
Roger Bradfield, 97, American children's author and illustrator.
Joe Comuzzi, 88, Canadian politician, MP (1988–2008).
Fred Cone, 95, American football player (Green Bay Packers, Dallas Cowboys), complications from hip surgery.
Juan Figer, 87, Brazilian-Uruguayan football agent, cardiac arrest.
Juraj Filas, 66, Slovak composer, complications from COVID-19.
Christine Grant, 85, Scottish-born American athletic director (University of Iowa).
Hteik Su Phaya Gyi, 98, Burmese princess.
Stephen Hartgen, 77, American news editor (Times-News) and politician, member of the Idaho House of Representatives (2008–2018).
Michael Inwood, 77, British philosopher, lung cancer.
José de Jesus Filho, 94, Brazilian jurist and politician, member of the Superior Court of Justice (1986–1997), acting minister of justice (1998).
Gábor Kállai, 62, Hungarian chess grandmaster.
Elihu Katz, 95, American-born Israeli sociologist and communication scientist.
Vadim Khamuttskikh, 52, Russian volleyball player, Olympic silver medalist (2000).
Strong Kobayashi, 81, Japanese professional wrestler (IWE, NJPW) and actor (Choudenshi Bioman), lung disease.
Valery Kovalyov, 51, Russian businessman and Wikimedian.
Long Zhiyi, 92, Chinese novelist and politician, chairman of CPPCC Guizhou Committee (1993–1998).
Csilla Madarász, 78, Hungarian Olympic swimmer (1964, 1968).
Sara McLanahan, 81, American sociologist, lung cancer.
Ivan Mozgovenko, 97, Russian clarinetist and music teacher.
Luigi Negri, 80, Italian Roman Catholic prelate, theologian and academic, bishop of San Marino-Montefeltro (2005–2012) and archbishop of Ferrara-Comacchio (2012–2017).
Richard Patten, 79, Canadian politician, Ontario MPP (1987–1990, 1995–2007).
Fred Pickard, 83, American college football player (Florida State Seminoles) and coach (Tennessee-Martin Pacers), complications from Parkinson's disease.
G. K. Pillai, 97, Indian actor (Kaaryasthan, Cochin Express, Danger Biscuit).
Gertrude Pressburger, 94, Austrian Holocaust survivor.
Jeanine Ann Roose, 84, American actress (It's a Wonderful Life), abdominal infection.
Billy Turner, 81, American horse trainer (Seattle Slew), Triple Crown winner (1977), cancer.
Betty White, 99, American actress (The Golden Girls, The Mary Tyler Moore Show, Hot in Cleveland) and comedian, five-time Emmy winner, complications from a stroke.

References

2021-12
12